The Wild Ride is a 1960 American film directed by Harvey Berman and starring Jack Nicholson as a rebellious punk named Johnny, of the Beat generation, who spends his days as an amateur dirt track driver in between partying and troublemaking. It was released by Filmgroup as a double feature with The Girl in Lovers Lane.The film has become part of the public domain and is considered by some to be a cult classic.

Plot
A rebellious punk of the beat generation spends his days as an amateur dirt track driver in between partying and troublemaking. He eventually kills a police officer, kidnaps his buddy's girlfriend, and sees his friend's life end in tragedy.

Re-cut version 
In 1999, The Wild Ride was re-edited with new footage that makes the original film a long flashback sequence. Running 88 minutes and titled Velocity, the new scenes feature Jack Nicholson impersonator Joe Richards playing an older version of the character originally played by Nicholson, as well as performances by Jorge Garcia, Jason Sudeikis, and Dick Miller.

Cast 
Jack Nicholson as Johnny Varron
Georgianna Carter as Nancy
Robert Bean as Dave
Carol Bigby as Joyce
John Bologni as Barny
Gary Espinosa as Cliff
Judith Tresize as Ann
Wesley Marie Tackitt
Sydene Wallace
Donna Dabney
Garry Korpi
Leonard Williams
John Holden
Raymond O'Day
Carl Vicknair as Police Officer #1

Production
The executive producer on the film was Roger Corman. Harvey Berman was a high school drama teacher in northern California who had gone to the UCLA drama school with some friends of Corman. He decided to make a film during the summer in and around Concord, California using some of his high school drama class students in the cast and crew and sending a few Hollywood professionals to work with them. One of these was Jack Nicholson. Corman later wrote "this is one of the little pictures I remember with pleasure; it turned out very well."

See also
 List of American films of 1960

References

External links 

 Like Dreamsville's synopsis of the film, with photos and commentary 

1960 films
1960 drama films
American auto racing films
American chase films
American drama films
American black-and-white films
1960s chase films
1960s English-language films
1960s American films